Maharajganj is a town and a nagar panchayat in Azamgarh district in the Indian state of Uttar Pradesh. It is connected to National Highway 233B (India), linking Azamgarh to Rajesultanpur.

Demographics

 Maharajganj had a population of 6,735. Males constitute 51% of the population and females 49%. Maharajganj has an average literacy rate of 67.93%, higher than the national average of 64.8%. Male literacy is 73%, and female literacy is 62.4%. In Maharajganj, 14% of the population is under 6.

Geography
Maharajganj is located within 6 km of Rajesultanpur and 24 km of Azamgarh. Maharajganj is situated on the southern side of the river Chhoti Saryu,

Transport
National Highway 233B (India) connects Azamgarh, Rajesultanpur, Gorakhpur and Muradpur to Mahrajganj.

References

Cities and towns in Azamgarh district